Jana Krivec (born May 30, 1980) is a Slovene chess player and a Woman Grandmaster.

She was Slovenian woman champion in 1997, 2000, 2002, 2003, 2005, 2006, and in 2009. 

Krivec played for the Slovenian Olympic team in 35th Chess Olympiad, 36th Chess Olympiad, 38th Chess Olympiad and 39th Chess Olympiad.

References

External links

Website Jane Krivec
Jana Krivec; card on Šahovska zveza Slovenije

1980 births
Chess woman grandmasters
Living people
Slovenian female chess players
People from Nova Gorica